Mark Clemence Telan (born January 12, 1976) is a Filipino former professional basketball player. He last played for the Talk 'N Text Tropang Texters in the Philippine Basketball Association. A former De La Salle Green Archer, he was 2-time UAAP basketball Most Valuable Player.  Telan entered the professional league in 1999 as a direct hire by the Tanduay Rhum Masters. When his team retooled the roster for the 2000 season, he was acquired by the Shell Turbo Chargers, where he was named Most Improved Player in 2000. In 2002, he was then picked by the Talk 'N Text Phone Pals. After his tenure with Talk 'N Text, he was traded to the Air21 Express and then to the Coca-Cola Tigers. In 2009, Telan signed up with the Rain or Shine Elasto Painters as the offer was not matched by his team Coca-Cola. In 2010, he returns to Talk 'N Text.

He is known to be a solid low post threat and a good outside shooter. His defense is also commendable. His style of play has often drawn comparisons with that of his favorite NBA player Toni Kukoč.

References

1976 births
Living people
Barako Bull Energy players
Basketball players from Isabela (province)
Centers (basketball)
Filipino men's basketball players
Mapúa University alumni
People from Isabela (province)
Philippine Basketball Association All-Stars
Power forwards (basketball)
Powerade Tigers players
Rain or Shine Elasto Painters players
Shell Turbo Chargers players
Tanduay Rhum Masters players
TNT Tropang Giga players
De La Salle Green Archers basketball players
Ilocano people